Thomas Klenke (born 31 October 1966 in Bad Pyrmont, Lower Saxony) is a German auto racing driver. In 2005 he competed in the FIA World Touring Car Championship for Ford Hotfiel Sport in a Ford Focus. The car was uncompetitive and Klenke scored no championship points with a best placed finish of tenth in Oschersleben. The team did not return to the WTCC in 2006.

In 2009 he won the 24 Hours of Nürburgring AT class in an alternative fuelled Volkswagen Scirocco GT24-CNG alongside Vanina Ickx, Peter Terting and Klaus Niedzwiedz.

His previous racing included Formula Renault in 1991. Most of his career has been spent in touring cars, competing in the German Touring Car Challenge, winning the championship in 2002 with Hotfiel Sport. Klenke also competed as an independent driver in the European Touring Car Championship.

Results

Complete World Touring Car Championship results
(key) (Races in bold indicate pole position) (Races in italics indicate fastest lap)

References

External links
 
 

1966 births
Living people
People from Bad Pyrmont
Racing drivers from Lower Saxony
German racing drivers
German Formula Renault 2.0 drivers
European Touring Car Championship drivers
World Touring Car Championship drivers
Nürburgring 24 Hours drivers
Volkswagen Motorsport drivers